Education in Nigeria is overseen by the Federal Ministry of Education. The local authorities take responsibility for implementing state-controlled policy regarding public education and state schools. The education system is divided into Kindergarten, Primary education, Secondary education, and Tertiary education.  Nigeria's federal government has been dominated by instability since declaring independence from Britain, and as a result, a unified set of education policies is yet to be successfully implemented. Regional differences in quality, curriculum, and funding characterize the education system in Nigeria. Currently, Nigeria possesses the largest population of out-of-school learning youths in the world. The educational systems in Nigeria are divided into two the public where the student  only pays for PTA while the private  where students pay school fees and some other fees like sports, exam fees, computer fees etc. and they are costly

Education in Nigerian schools takes place in English. In November 30, 2022, the education minister Adamu Adamu announced a government plan to abolish instruction in English on primary schools in favour of Nigeria's local languages.

Primary education

Primary education begins at around age 5 for the majority of Nigerians. Students spend six years in primary school and graduate with a school-leaving certificate. Subjects taught at the primary level include Mathematics, English language, Christian Religious Knowledge, Islamic Knowledge Studies, Agricultural science, Home economics and one of the three main indigenous languages and cultures: Hausa-Fulani, Yoruba, and Igbo. Private schools also offer Computer Science, French, and Fine Arts. Primary school pupils are required to take a Common Entrance Examination to qualify for admission into the Federal and State Government Secondary schools, as well as Private ones.

Before 1976, education policy was still largely shaped by the colonial policy of the British Colonial Period. In 1976, the Universal Primary Education program was established.  This program faced many difficulties and was subsequently revised in 1981 and 1990. The Universal Basic Education (UBE) was formed in 1999 and this came as a replacement of the Universal Primary Education and intended to enhance the success of the first nine years of schooling.  The UBE involves 6 years of Primary School education and 3 years of Junior Secondary School education, culminating in 9 years of uninterrupted schooling, and transition from one class to another is automatic but determined through continuous assessment. This scheme is monitored by the Universal Basic Education Commission, UBEC, and has made it "free", "" and a right of every child.
Therefore, the UBEC law section 15 defines UBE as early childhood care and education. The law says a 9-year formal schooling, adult literacy and non-formal education, skill acquisition programs, and the education of special groups such as nomads and migrants, girl child and women, Al-majiri, out of school and disabled people (Aderinoye, 2007).

Secondary education
Secondary school is a link between the primary and tertiary levels of education. It is the form of education children receive after primary education and before tertiary stage
(Solomon, 2015). Students spend six years in Secondary School, which is 3 years of JSS (Junior Secondary School), and 3 years of SSS (Senior Secondary School). During the 3 years of Junior Secondary School education, students are to take subjects such as Mathematics, English, Social Studies, cultural and creative arts, basic science and technology, pre-vocational studies, French, business education, Home Economics, Computer Studies or Fine arts. Senior Secondary curriculum is based on 4 core subjects completed by 4 or 5 elective subjects. Core subjects are: English; mathematics; Economics; Civic Education; one or more electives out of Biology, Chemistry, Physics for science class; one or more electives out of English literature, History, Geography, Agricultural science or a vocational subject which includes: Book Keeping, Commerce, Food and Nutrition, Technical Drawing amongst other 17 subjects.

After the BECE, students can also join a technical college. The curriculum for these also lasts 3 years and leads to a trade/craftsmanship certificate.

The Federal Republic of Nigeria is made up of thirty-six States and the Federal Capital Territory and there are about two Federal Government Colleges in each state. These schools are funded and managed directly by the Federal Government through the Ministry of Education. There are also Command Schools run by the Nigerian Army and other military schools run by the Airforce and Navy. Teachers who want to teach in Nigerian schools must have either a National Certificate in Education, bachelor's degree in education or a bachelor's degree in a subject field combined with a postgraduate diploma in education. These schools are supposed to be model schools carrying and maintaining the ideals of secondary education for Nigerian students. Admission is based on merit, determined by the National Common Entrance Examination taken by all final year elementary school pupils. Tuition and fees are very low, approximately twenty-five thousand naira ($69.08) because partial funding comes from the Federal Government.

State-owned secondary schools are funded by its state government and are not comparable to Federal government colleges. Although, education is supposed to be free in the majority of the state-owned institutions, students are required to purchase books, uniforms and pay for miscellaneous things costing them an average of fifty thousand naira ($130) in one academic year. Teachers in state-owned institutions usually have a National Certificate of Education or a bachelor's degree, but this is not always the case as many secondary schools in Nigeria are filled with unqualified teachers who end up not being able to motivate their students, these schools are often understaffed due to low state budgets, lack of incentives and irregularities in payment of staff salaries. Some state-owned secondary schools are regarded as elite colleges because of the historically high educational standard and alumni who have become prominent citizens and successful in various careers. However, the college ranking of these institutions have since dropped because of the arrival of some privately owned institutions.

Private secondary schools in Nigeria tend to be quite expensive with an average fees ranging from two hundred and fifty thousand naira to one million naira ($652.00 – $2600.00) annually. These schools have smaller classes (approximately ten to twenty students per class), modern equipment and a better learning environment. Most teachers in these institutions possess at least a bachelor's degree in a specific course area and are sent for workshops or short-term programs on a regular basis.

Promotional examinations
With the introduction of the 6-3-3-4 system of education in Nigeria, the recipient of the education would spend six years in primary school, three years in junior secondary school, three years in senior secondary school, and four years in a tertiary institution. The six years spent in primary school and the three years spent in junior secondary school are merged to form the nine in the 9-3-4 system. Altogether, the students must spend a minimum period of six years in Secondary School. During this period, students are expected to spend three years in Junior Secondary School and three years in Senior Secondary School.

The General Certificate of Education Examination (GCE) was replaced by the Senior Secondary Certificate Examination (SSCE). The SSCE is conducted at the end of the Secondary School studies in May/June. The GCE is conducted in October/November as a supplement for those students who did not get the required credits from their SSCE results. The standards of the two examinations are basically the same. A body called West African Examination Council (WAEC) conducts both the SSCE and GCE. A maximum of nine and a minimum of seven subjects are registered for the examination by each student with Mathematics and English Language taken as compulsory.

A maximum of nine grades are assigned to each subject from: A1, B2, B3 (Equivalent to Distinctions Grade); C4, C5, C6 (Equivalent to Credit Grade); D7, E8 (Just Pass Grade); F9 (Fail Grade). Credit grades and above is considered academically adequate for entry into any University in Nigeria. In some study programs, many of the universities may require higher grades to get admission.

The Federal Government policy on education is agreed to by all secondary schools in Nigeria. Six years of elementary school is followed by six years of secondary school. Junior Secondary school consists of JSS1, JSS2 and JSS3 which are equivalent to the 7th, 8th and 9th Grade while the Senior Secondary school consists of SS I, SS 2, and SS 3 which is equivalent to the 10th, 11th and 12th Grade. The Senior Secondary School Examination (SSCE) is taken at the end of the SS 3. The West African Examination Council (WAEC) administers both exams. Three to six months after a student has taken the SSCE examination, they are issued an official transcript from their institution. This transcript is valid for one year, after which an Official transcript from the West African Examination Council is issued.

The National Examination Council is another examination body in Nigeria; it administers the Senior Secondary School Examination (SSCE) in June/July. The body also administers the General Certificate of Education Examination (GCE) in December/January. Students often take both WAEC and NECO examinations in SSS 3.

International education 
As of January 2015, the International Schools Consultancy (ISC) listed Nigeria as having 129 international schools. "ISC defines an international school as schools which deliver a curriculum to any combination of pre-school, primary or secondary students, wholly or partly in English outside an English-speaking country, or if a school in a country where English is one of the official languages, offers an English-medium curriculum other than the country’s national curriculum and is international in its orientation." This definition is used by publications including The Economist.

A-levels in Nigeria 
Interim Joint Matriculation Board (IJMB) is an advanced level education programme, which is designed for students intending to go to university without going through JAMB Joint Admissions and Matriculation Board exams either undergraduate or direct entry.  The IJMB examination is primarily for Advanced Level subjects for Direct Entry into 200 level in the Universities. The syllabus for the IJMB Examination is compiled in line with international standard educational requirements and admission requirements of various Universities, Nigeria and overseas. It runs for 9 months and has 2 semesters.

IJMB is a national educational programme approved by the Federal Government, coordinated nationwide by Ahmadu Bello University, Zaria, with different affiliated Study Centres across the country. The IJMB programme provides a platform that enables successful IJMB candidates to secure direct admission into 200 Level in Nigerian Universities and Abroad.

It is government approved and has international recognition. It can be used to gain entry into the second year of any tertiary institution in Nigeria.

IJMBE is certified by Nigeria University Commission (NUC) and Joint Admission Matriculation Board (JAMB) as an A'level programme that qualifies candidates to secure direct admission into 200 Level in the Universities upon successful completion of the IJMB programme.  For effective coverage of the IJMB syllabus, a minimum of 8-10 lecture hours per week is recommended, IJMB practical and field works included. The IJMB syllabus may be revised every eight years.

The Joint Universities Preliminary Examinations Board (JUPEB) is another advanced level programme that enables students gain admission into 200 level in most universities in Nigeria by direct entry (DE). The programme runs for about 8 months and admission is given through JAMB Joint Admissions and Matriculation Board even though students who undergo this programme do not need to sit for the Unified Tertiary Matriculation Examination (UTME).

JUPEB is government approved and the board is responsible for accrediting universities that are able to run the programme. Most universities in Nigeria accept JUPEB for direct entry admissions but not all are accredited to run the programme

Tertiary education 

The government has majority control of university education. Tertiary education in Nigeria consists of Universities (Public and Private), Polytechnics, Monotechnics, and Colleges of education. The country has a total number of 153 universities registered by NUC among  which federal and state government own 40 and 45 respectively while 68 universities are privately owned as at August, 2017. According to the Federal Ministry of Education, Nigeria has 43 approved federal universities, 47 approved state universities, 75 approved private universities, 28 approved federal polytechnics, 43 approved state polytechnics, 51 approved private polytechnics, 22 approved federal colleges, 47 approved state colleges and 26 approved private colleges. In order to increase the number of universities in Nigeria, the Federal Government gave 9 new private universities their licenses in May 2015. The names of the universities that got licenses in Abuja included, Augustine University, Ilara, Lagos; Chrisland University, Owode, Ogun State; Christopher University, Mowe, Ogun State; Hallmark University, Ijebu-Itele, Ogun State; Kings University, Ode-Omu, Osun State; Michael and Cecilia Ibru University, Owhrode, Delta State; Mountain Top University, Makogi/Oba Ogun state; Ritman University, Ikot-Epene, Akwa- Ibom State and Summit University, Offa, Kwara State.

The Federal Executive Council of the President Muhammadu Buhari government, approved the establishment of 20 new private universities on February 3, 2021, in Nigeria. The list and location of the newly approved Universities and their locations are as follows: 1. Mudiame University, Irrua, Edo State 2. Claretian University, Nekede, Imo State 3.  Ave-Maria University, Piyanko, Nasarawa State 4. Topfaith University, Mkpatak, Akwa Ibom State   5. Maranatha University, Mgbidi, Imo State   6. Al-Istqama University, Sumaila, Kano State  7. Havilla University, Nde-Ikom, Cross River State    8. Karl Kumm University, Vom, Plateau State   9.  Nok University, Kachia, Kaduna State   10.   Thomas Adewumi University, Oko Irese, Kwara State 11. Ahman Pategi University, Patigi, Kwara State   12. Anan University, Kwall, Plateau State   13. Capital City University, Kano, Kano State 14. Edusoko University, Bida, Niger State   15.  James Hope University, Agbor, Delta State  16. Khadija University, Majia, Jigawa State  17. Maryam Abacha American University Of Nigeria, Kano, Kano State   18.  Mewar International University Nigeria, Masaka, Nasarawa State  19.  Philomath University, Kuje, Abuja   20. University Of Offa, Offa, Kwara State.

First year entry requirements into most universities in Nigeria include: Minimum of SSCE/GCE Ordinary Level Credits at maximum of two sittings; Minimum cut-off marks score in Joint Admissions and Matriculation Board (JAMB) entrance examination of 180 and above out of a maximum of 400 marks are required. Candidates with minimum of Merit Pass in National Certificate of Education (NCE), National Diploma (ND) and other Advanced Level Certificates minimum qualifications with minimum of 5 O/L Credits are given direct entry admission into the appropriate undergraduate degree programs.

Students with required documents typically enter university from age 17-18 onwards and study for an academic degree. Historically, universities are divided into several tiers.

First generation universities 
The history of university education in Nigeria can be traced to the Elliot Commission of 1943, which culminated in the establishment of University College, Ibadan in 1948.

Five of these universities were established between 1948 and 1965, following the recommendation of the Ashby Commission set up by the British Colonial Government to study the necessity of university education for Nigeria. These universities are fully funded by the federal government. They were established primarily to meet a need for qualified personnel in Nigeria and to set basic standards for university education. These universities have continued to play their roles for the production of qualified personnel and the provision of standards, which have helped to guide the subsequent establishments of other generations of universities in Nigeria. Universities in this tier are the following:
 University of Ibadan
 University of Nigeria, Nsukka
 Obafemi Awolowo University
 Ahmadu Bello University Zaria
 University of Lagos

Second generation universities 
With the increasing population of qualified students for university education in Nigeria and the growing needs for scientific and technological developments, setting up more universities became imperative. Between 1970 and 1985, 12 additional universities were established in various parts of the country.
 University of Calabar
 University of Ilorin
 University of Jos
 University of Maiduguri
 University of Port Harcourt
 Bayero University, Kano

Third generation universities

The third generation universities were established between 1980 and early 1990 to address special areas of Technological and Agricultural demand response to a nationally acclaimed need for skilled manpower. These universities are:
 Federal University of Technology, Owerri
 University of Agriculture, Makurdi
 Federal University of Technology, Yola
 Federal University of Technology, Akure
 Federal University of Technology, Bauchi
 Federal University of Technology, Minna
 Federal University of Agriculture, Abeokuta

State universities

Pressures from qualified students from each state who could not readily get admissions to any of the Federal Universities continued to mount on States Governments. It became imperative and urgent for some State Governments to invest in the establishment of Universities.

Private universities

Private universities are institutions that are owned, managed and run by private individuals and organisations. The Federal Government established a law in 1993, allowing private sectors to establish universities following guidelines prescribed by the Government.

The typical duration of undergraduate programs in Nigerian universities depends largely on the program of study. For example, Social Sciences/Humanity related courses are 4 Years, I.C.T related courses are 4 years, Engineering/Technology related courses are 5 Years, Pharmacy courses are 5 Years, and Law courses are 5 Years, each with two semester sessions per year. Medicine (Vet/Human) degrees take 6 Years and have longer sessions during the year.

On 3 February 2021, the Nigerian Universities Commission approved additional 20 Universities which has now made 99 approved Private Universities in Nigeria.

Vocational education 
Within education in Nigeria, vocational training and informal education dominate as the central forms of sharing regionally specific knowledge. Administration of vocational education in the country is overseen by the National Board for Technical Education.  In the early 1980s, as a result of high unemployment rates for school graduates, the Nigerian government placed a new emphasis on making vocational programs available to students. The most significant plan for improvement was the Master Plan for 2001-2010 for the Development of the National Vocational Education system developed by the Federal Ministry of Education in 2000.  Current challenges for the enforcement of these systems includes a shortage of teachers, poor statistics on the labour market needs, and outdated curriculum and technology at vocational training centers.  As it stands now, students in Nigeria can pursue either a National Technical Certificate or an Advanced National Technical Certificate.  Administration of these certificates is overseen by the National Business and Technical Examinations Board (NABTEB). In addition to institutional forms of vocational education, the Nigerian government allows and encourages participation in apprenticeships. These apprenticeships are instrumental in instilling the skills involved with a specific trade, but they also instill a commitment to community values including: patience, determination, and respect. Child Labour laws prevent children younger than 15 from entering the workforce, but children less than 15 years of age may legally procure apprenticeships.  While efforts are being made to improve the quality and availability of vocational education, many policy oriented approaches have been blocked by a small number of politicians. The failures to properly implement a national approach to worker's education has roots in the political instability of the country.  To this end, many academics have questioned if politicians are attempting to intentionally subjugate the working class through a lack of educational breadth.

Informal education and literacy programs 

Informal modes of education have formed a foundation for tertiary education in Nigeria for many years and are still at play today.  These programs and structures are difficult to study and assess unanimously as they are decentralized and unique in their missions and practices. Many academics have concluded that an overall lack of funding and centralization has significantly hindered the quality, funding, and implementation of literacy programs for both school age children and adults. However, many have achieved success at promoting employment and increasing economic mobility for those who have utilized the programs. In addition to vocational apprenticeships, the Nigerian government and various NGOs have introduced communal based strategies for increasing literacy rates among both children and adults. One such example is the Centre of Excellence for Literacy and Literacy Education (CELLE), an NGO committed to accelerating national development through literacy education.  In 1992, CELLE launched the Premier Reading Club (PRC), which is a nationally organized club with defined structure and methods for teaching children and adults to read and share their ideas. These programs have achieved varying levels of success with the primary challenge being that funding is difficult to come by.  Formal and informal literacy education in Nigeria received a significant boost under the colonial rule of Britain, but since independence in 1960, educational funding across the board has been lacking. Informal education has also aimed at addressed issues other than illiteracy.  Calls to incorporate informal HIV/AIDS education into the prison education system have been frequent and met with limited and varied response.    This population is in need of this education as inmates are not exposed to the standard methods of TV and print media campaigns addressing the issue. From a psychological perspective, much of the informal education of adults is based on western research regarding psychology and social sciences.  However, increasing academic movements are aiming to contextualize and build upon these western based ideals for the sake of social betterment in Nigeria, as well as developing nations around the world. Overall, the informal education system in Nigeria can be described as nuanced and complicated.  Despite large support for investment in adult literacy and vocational programs, small groups of politicians and funding challenges have stalled the implementation of many literacy and vocational programs. One study regarding the involvement of the national government in education and literacy programs concluded that the high illiteracy rates in Nigeria were significantly related to the government's lack of commitment towards its standardized education policies.

Female education 

Education has been recognized as a basic human right since the 1948 adoption of the Universal Declaration of Human Rights. A positive correlation exists between the enrollment of girls in primary school and the gross national product and life expectancy. Because of this correlation, enrollment in schools represents the largest component of societal investment into human capital. Rapid socioeconomic development of a nation has been observed to depend on the calibre of women and their education in that country. Women participation in education has been on increase, several motivations are employed by NGO, local, state, and federal government to encourage more women in education. Women can now been seen in various high-profile careers. That being said, there are still many challenges preventing gender equality in the Nigerian education system.  There is a significant bias against female involvement in specific academic disciplines, with studies showing the existence of gender-based stereotyping of students by teachers in secondary schools. The most dominant barriers are currently teen pregnancy, teen marriage, religious beliefs, poverty, and poor school facilities. In recent years, the rise of militancy groups such as the Boko Haram, Bandits, Unknown Gunmen and the Niger Delta militancy have contributed to destabilization of the education system.

In a bid to improve female education in girls, the UNICEF initiated some projects in Nigeria. one of them is The Girls’ Education Project initiated through a Memorandum of Understanding signed in December 2004 between the United Nations Children's Fund and the United Kingdom Department for International Development. The Girls’ Education Project Memorandum of Understanding focused on supporting Federal Government of Nigeria initiatives that aim at achieving Universal Primary Education and Universal Basic Education as stipulated in the six Education for All goals. The Girls’ Education Project 3 Cash Transfer Programme (GEP3-CTP) was designed as a social protection programme for mitigating the impact of poverty on girl child enrolment and school attendance in Niger and Sokoto States. The programme was implemented for two years (2014 to 2016). UNICEF has commissioned Capra International to assess the programme against five criteria in order to better understand how the programme was implemented, the impacts achieved, and identify lessons that can inform further implementation of the Cash Transfer Programme.

GEP3-CTP was a two-year unconditional cash transfer programme (September 2014 - August 2016) with primary objective of increasing girls' enrolment, retention and completion of basic education in selected schools in Niger and Sokoto States. The impact evaluation of GEP3-CTP was carried out by Capra International, a division of Ghubril Ltd, from October 2016 to March 2017 in two stages. The first stage was the Evaluability Assessment of GEP3-CTP, and the second stage was the Impact Assessment of GEP3-CTP.

Secondary education in Nigeria's rural areas 

In Nigeria's National Policy on education (FRN 1998) it is stated that the federal government has adopted education as an instrument for effecting national development in all areas of the nation. Education in rural Nigeria is characterized with very poor infrastructure, insufficient academic staff, insecurity and non-payment of staff among others.

Education is fundamental to the growth and development, and serves as a critical index in measuring the process of the development agenda. However, rural schools in Nigeria are in a "sorry state" and it is a common knowledge that a majority of the population in developing countries like Nigeria live in rural areas, which are largely neglected by the government when it comes to development.

See also
 List of Nigerian universities
 National Universities Commission
 List of polytechnics in Nigeria
 list of colleges of education in Nigeria
 Schools in Nigeria
 Digital divide in Nigeria
 Confraternities in Nigeria

References

Further reading
 Ajayi, J. F. A., Lameck, K. H. Goma and G. Ampah Johnson. The African Experience with Higher Education (Accra: Association of African Universities, 1996).
 
 
 Ashby, Eric, with Mary Anderson. Universities: British, Indian, African: A Study in the Ecology of Higher Education (London: Weidenfeld & Nicolson, 1966).
 Fafunwa, A. Babs. History of Education in Nigeria (London: Allen & Unwin, 1974).
 Fafunwa, A. Babs. A History of Nigerian Higher Education (Lagos: Macmillan, 1971).
 Livsey, Timothy. "Imagining an Imperial Modernity: Universities and the West African Roots of Colonial Development." Journal of Imperial and Commonwealth History 44#6 (2016): 952–975.
 Niles, F. Sushila. "Parental Attitudes toward Female Education in Northern Nigeria." Journal of Social Psychology, Volume 129, No. 1, p. 13–20. February 1989 – See profile at Education Resources Information Center (ERIC)
 Nwauwa, Apollos O. Imperialism, Academe and Nationalism: Britain and University Education for Africans, 1860–1960 (London: Frank Cass, 1997)
 Obiezu, Timothy (2018). https://www.globalcitizen.org/en/content/un-nigeria-13-million-children-out-of-school/  .
 Ogunlade, Festus O. "Education and Politics in Colonial Nigeria: The Case of King’s College, Lagos (1906–1911)." Journal of the Historical Society of Nigeria 7#2 (1974): 325–345.
 Okafor, N. The Development of Universities in Nigeria (London: Longman, 1971).
 Tibenderana, Peter K. Education and Cultural Change in Northern Nigeria, 1906–1966: A Study in the Creation of a Dependent Culture (Kampala: Fountain, 2003).
 Whitehead, Clive. "The ‘Two-way Pull’ and the Establishment of University Education in British West Africa." History of Education 16#2 (1987): 119–133.

External links
 Ministry of Education, Nigeria
 World data on Education: Nigeria, UNESCO-IBE(2010–2011) – Overview of the Nigerian Education system
 Vocational education in Nigeria, UNESCO-UNEVOC(2012) – Overview of the Nigerian technical and vocational education system